Charles T. Meide Jr., known as Chuck Meide, (born March 23, 1971) is an underwater and maritime archaeologist and currently the Director of LAMP (Lighthouse Archaeological Maritime Program), the research arm of the St. Augustine Lighthouse & Maritime Museum located in St. Augustine, Florida.

Meide, of Syrian descent on his father's side, was born in Jacksonville, Florida, and raised in the nearby coastal town of Atlantic Beach. He earned BA and MA degrees in Anthropology with a focus in underwater archaeology in 1993 and 2001 from Florida State University, where he studied under George R. Fischer, and undertook Ph.D. studies in Historical Archaeology at the College of William and Mary starting the following year. Meide has participated in a wide array of shipwreck and maritime archaeological projects across the U.S., especially in Florida, and throughout the Caribbean and Bermuda and in Australia and Ireland. From 1995 to 1997 he participated in the search for, discovery, and total excavation of La Salle's shipwreck,   La Belle , lost in 1686. From December 1997 to January 1998 he served as Co-Director (with David Johnson) of the Kingstown Harbour Shipwreck Project, an investigation sponsored by the Institute of Maritime History and Florida State University into the wreck of the French frigate  lost in 1780 in St. Vincent and the Grenadines.  
In 1999 he directed the Dog Island Shipwreck Survey, a comprehensive maritime survey of the waters around a barrier island off the coast of Franklin County, Florida, and between 2004 and 2006 he directed the Achill Island Maritime Archaeology Project off the coast of County Mayo, Ireland. Since taking over as Director of LAMP in 2006, he has directed the First Coast Maritime Archaeology Project, a state-funded research and educational program focusing on shipwrecks and other maritime archaeological resources in the offshore and inland waters of Northeast Florida. In 2009, during this project, Meide discovered the "Storm Wreck," a ship from the final fleet to evacuate British troops and Loyalist refugees from Charleston at the end of the Revolutionary War, which wrecked trying to enter St. Augustine in late December 1782. He led the archaeological excavation of this shipwreck site each summer from 2010 through 2015, overseeing the recovery of thousands of well-preserved artifacts.

On July 10, 2014, the St. Augustine Lighthouse & Museum announced at a press conference that Meide would lead an expedition to search for the lost French fleet of Jean Ribault, wrecked in 1565. The search area was located in Canaveral National Seashore waters, and was carried out in partnership with the National Park Service, the State of Florida, NOAA's Office of Ocean Exploration, the Center for Historical Archaeology, and the Institute of Maritime History. When one of Ribault’s ship’s was discovered by a treasure hunter, Meide along with a small team of scholars worked closely with lawyers for the Republic of France, providing historical evidence leading to a federal court ruling that the vessel remains the property of the French government. 

From 2016 to 2019, Meide directed the excavation of the "Anniversary Wreck," another 18th-century shipwreck with a well-preserved assemblage of artifacts, believed to represent a merchant vessel lost while trying to enter St. Augustine. 

Chuck Meide served on the board of the Institute of Maritime History from 2005 to 2022, as vice president from 2009 to 2022, and currently serves in an advisory role. He is the co-founder of the Cannon Finders Club (established in 1996 in Cincinnati, Ohio). Meide has been featured in many documentary films, including episodes of PBS’s Secrets of the Dead, Science Channel’s Shipwreck Secrets, and National Geographic Channel’s Drain the Oceans.

Meide has authored over 50 research papers, reports, theses, book chapters, and journal articles.

See also 
Lighthouse Archaeological Maritime Program (LAMP)

References

External links 
 Texas Historical Commission La Salle Shipwreck Project
 Achill Island Maritime Archaeology Project
 Institute of Maritime History
 Lighthouse Archaeological Maritime Program (LAMP)
 NOAA Ocean Explorer Career Profile of Chuck Meide, 2014
 Meide's written works on Academia.edu

21st-century American archaeologists
American underwater divers
College of William & Mary alumni
Florida State University alumni
People from Atlantic Beach, Florida
People from St. Augustine, Florida
Underwater archaeologists
American people of Syrian descent
Living people
1971 births